The badminton women's singles tournament at the 1990 Asian Games in Beijing took place from 2 October to 6 October.

Schedule
All times are China Standard Time (UTC+08:00)

Results
Legend
WO — Won by walkover

References
Results

External links
 Olympic Council of Asia

Women's singles